Dominick Martin, better known by his stage name Calibre, is a Northern Irish drum and bass music producer and DJ from Belfast. He started producing at a young age. He is a classically trained musician, playing a variety of musical instruments. Martin started producing Drum and Bass in 1995 and his first signed release was credited under the now defunct Quadrophonic record label.

He soon came to the attention of drum and bass DJ Fabio, who signed Calibre to his record label, Creative Source.
While studying Fine Arts at the University of Ulster in Belfast, he became interested in the music of John Cage whose work was influential in titling Martin's first album release Musique Concrète in 2001. Since his initial releases in 2001, Martin has been known for his consistent signature style and sound.

Short Circuits Magazine refers to him as "one of the quietest people in drum and bass". Although one of the scene's most prolific producers, he shares tracks with only a small circle of friends and many of his works remain unreleased. Beginning in 2007, the 'Shelflife' series of albums were created as a way of sharing previously unreleased productions with his fans.

Over 20 years of music production, he has self-published over 60 singles and 20+ albums. Also, according to UKF as of 2014, none of his original productions have ever been officially remixed.

2001: Musique Concrete

On 25 September 2001, Calibre released his debut album on the Creative Source label run by the DJ and Drum & Bass veteran Fabio. Spanning 5x vinyl / double CD, the album began to define Calibre's soulful and melodic sound and imprint his name amongst the emerging Liquid Funk artists of the time.

CD1

 Deep Everytime
 Right Stuff
 Version
 Untitled
 Say If You Love
 Run Again
 Vice 	
 U Make It Hot
 Things A Re-Arranging
 Always

CD2

 Our Love Part 1 
 Our Love Part 2
 Feeder
 Sax Track
 Inflicted
 What U Need
 Let The Music Play
 Parallels
 Future Life
 Crazy
 Light Years

Signature Records
In 2003, Martin decided to launch a self-published record label, Signature Records, which became his vehicle for publishing his music. Martin states, "There won't be any other artists on the label for the foreseeable future". For a few years the label's website ran of the back of Soul:R, the record label he ran alongside Marcus Intalex. With the Soul:R website receiving very few updates since 2006, Calibre published most of his work and news through his own MySpace page however he deleted this in early July 2011.

2005: Second Sun
November 2005 marked Martin's second full-length album release, through the Signature label, entitled Second Sun. Second Sun was released after much anticipation following his 2001 release. He stated, "I look upon my move to Logic as a process in the studio to be a second part of the story. But having said that, the 22nd is my birth date, it's my second album, I'm the second son in the family, this is the second phase production wise but for me its nothing to do with numerology, its more to do with reinvention, a new life." The album Second Sun is regarded by those working in and those listening to Drum and Bass as a landmark release for the genre. On 17 September 2008, BBC 1Xtra Drum and Bass DJ Bailey gave special praise to the title track of the album, noting it as the tune of the festival for Sun and Bass 2008, a dedicated Drum and Bass festival which is held in Sardinia.

 Bullets feat. Diane Charlemagne
 Second Sun
 All The While
 Don't Watch This
 Got A Thing
 Is It U	
 Drop It Down feat. Singing Fats 	
 Go Back To Go Forward
 Blink of an Eye feat. Lariman 
 Breathing Man	
 Kiya feat. Crow 
 Timeout feat. DRS 
 Drinnahilly	
 These Few

2007: Shelflife
In October 2007, Martin released Shelflife a retrospective album featuring 21 unreleased productions spanning from 1998–2005.

CD 1

 Venus And Mars 
 South Self
 Stay High 
 Less Los Ablos 
 Jibaro
 STCal - STCal Roller 	
 Shades 	
 Klute – Part Of Me (Remix) 
 Easy on My Mind 
 Re Entry

CD 2

 Untitled 
 Acrobat 
 Makes Me Wonder (Original) 	
 Cold Blade
 I'll Stay 
 South Self
 Free 
 Turn Around 
 Beat 97 
 Peace Of Mind feat. Lariman 	
 Idris 
 Time And Space

2008: Overflow
Martin released Overflow in Spring 2008. Overflow features vocals from Martin himself, along with his artwork.

CD1

 Savannah Heat
 Slums (Featuring – DRS)
 Alone In A Crowd
 Overeaction Featuring – Lariman
 Suddenly
 Into The Groove	
 Leave Me	
 Klute – Part Of Me (Remix) 
 Lo Note
 Beat Goes On

CD2

 TV On
 Shine (Featuring – Spacek)
 Always Lovin You
 You Used To Listen (Featuring – DRS)
 Big Bang
 Honeypot	
 Gage
 Reach You Everywhere
 So Blue

2009: Shelflife 2
In January 2009 there were final confirmations from S.T Holdings and Calibre's MySpace, Shelf Life Vol. 2 was to be released on 11 May 2009. Another retrospective album including the long lasting dubplates "Life" and "Why Time". As with previous albums, this release featured few guest artists, but there were vocal contributions from Lariman and MC D.R.S. As with previous albums, this was a double album. It also includes many downtempo tracks.

CD1

 Out Of The Box
 Nightlight
 All The Days
 Harbinger
 Nowheretobefound (Featuring – Lariman)
 Fine As Dust	
 Mindprint
 The Cage (Featuring – Basil & ST Files)
 Soft Tear

CD2

 Lazy Rock
 Life
 Half Full
 What To Do In These Times
 Overeaction Dub (Featuring – Lariman)
 Harry	
 Zombie Life
 Find A Way
 The Blues

2009: Shine a Light
Soon after the release of Shelf Life Vol. 2, Calibre stated he would be releasing his long anticipated downtempo album, Shine a Light. In October 2009 S.T Holding announced it to be released on Monday 16 November. Calibre stated that he has wanted to release a downtempo album for the last two years, but decided to release his second retrospective album first. “I have spent over 10 years writing music, the majority of my work being drum and bass, so i wanted to write an album that wasn’t attached to a particular musical genre; to me it felt like feeling my way in the dark”

 The Truth (Feat. DRS)
 Change
 The Marchers
 Last Kiss
 Footprints
 Beyond
 Something I Said
 The Tide
 Man On The Road
 Devise

2010: Even If
In June 2010 Calibre released Even If on his label Signature Records. Featuring predominantly Drum & Bass, Calibre said of the album, "If I wanted to achieve anything it was mainly to write something that I personally enjoyed, on an individual basis I wanted to mix some genre’s and try to transcend the DNB tag as much as I was referencing it, and hopefully in the process reach out to those out there that like my music."

 All You Got
 Even If
 Rose	
 Broken	
 Thirst Dub	
 Me Myself And I	
 Steptoe
 Open Your Eyes	
 Acid Hands	
 Section Dub	
 Gone Away	
 No Reply	
 Manchester Nights

2011: Condition
Released in October 2011, Condition was described by Mixmag magazine as “a shape-shifting trove of wonders that leaps ambitiously from the serene to the brutal”, awarded Drum ′N′ Bass album of the month and rated 5/5.

Calibre himself describing this album: "Condition is my drum and bass follow up to "Even If", I originally wanted to make an album that was more dance floor influenced, to have a more light hearted approach, in some ways it has that, but I couldn't stop myself from making the deeper material, for years i have wrestled with the subtle side of drum and bass, my journey has been one that tries to attain the simple groove, to keep removing the layers of this music, this album is an expression of this, and how im still feeling the underdog waiting for the cycle....... it came about as it always has and that's the way its supposed to, enjoyable and moving fast to discover the stillness."

 People Never Change (Featuring – DRS)
 Nottinghill	
 Who's Singing	
 Mirage	
 No More	
 Foreign Bodies	
 Ugly Duckling	
 Half&Half	
 Garbage Man	
 Schlager	
 Closing Doors (Featuring – DRS)
 Blackhole Dub	
 Windows

2013: Spill
In 2013 Calibre released his ninth album entitled Spill featuring collaborations with Steo and Chimpo. Of the album he states "The collaborations gave me something a little bit different and that has encouraged me to follow this path for the next lp which will be a journey of collaborations over the next year, one which I have already started. My favourite track would probably be ‘Sick Of It All’ because it feels a bit different than the rest."

 Dema Beats	
 Running	
 Think On	
 Keep Control	
 Close To Me	
 Cully Bridge	
 Simple Things	
 Start Again (Featuring – Chimpo)
 Do Not Turn On Me	
 Wilderness (Featuring – Steo)
 Key Flix	
 Paragov	
 Sick Of It All

2013: Valentia
In 2013 Calibre released the album Valentia under his own name, Dominick Martin.  The album was titled after Valentia Island, located off of the south-western coast of Ireland, where much of it was recorded.  Martin, who brought with him only a laptop and microphone, said of the location: "in one of the rooms sat a piano, and as my fingers touched the keys I knew there was a story there waiting to be told. The sound of the piano in that place was something very magical as 100mph winds battered the house and interrupted my recordings."

In a 12 April 2013 interview with DJ Magazine, he described the project in more detail: "This album is like a singer/songwriter album, it’s like its own big story in itself. I went to the West Coast of Ireland and there was this big storm brewing, and I was scared to death, and I was writing out of fear, it was crazy. I wrote this album down there, I sampled a piano and it’s exactly that material that brings me away from drum & bass." Valentia was released digitally as well as in a limited physical CD and Vinyl release through Signature records on 15 July 2013.

 Easy Living 	
 Need 	
 Tabletop 	
 Autumn 
 Lakeside 	
 Time 	
 My Friend Alone 	
 I Wish I Could 
 Love Is 
 Rebels With A Cause 	
 Valentia Paino

2014: Shelflife 3
The third addition to the 'Shelflife' series was released in 2014, Shelflife 3 contained thirteen of his most requested unreleased productions from 1997 to 2013. Production was primarily by himself with the addition of vocalist MC D.R.S. on the songs "Fear Of Letting Go" and "Eschaton".

 The Wash 	
 Miraculous 	
 Honey Dew 	
 Fear Of Letting Go (Featuring - DRS) 	
 Makes Me Feel Alright
 Bellamee 	
 Instant 
 Off Key 
 Sagan 	
 Eschaton (Featuring - DRS) 	
 To And Fro 	
 Rooftops 	
 Erode

2016: Shelflife 4
Released in 2016, Shelflife 4 features primarily drum & bass productions, with collaborations coming from Jazz vocalist and MC Cleveland Watkiss and fellow Drum and Bass DJ and producer DJ Marky.

 Latin Ways	
 Space Time (Featuring – Cleveland Watkiss)
 Model Way	
 Salsoul	
 Down On You	
 Spirit Catcher	
 All One Call	
 Amen Tune (Featuring – DJ Marky)
 Underfire	
 Bottles & Airports	
 Justice	
 Hold The Light	
 Love Worn Soul

2016: Grow
In 2016 Calibre released Grow on 'The Nothing Special' label run by fellow DJ and friend Craig Richards (DJ). Marking a departure from his label Signature Records, Grow is notable for its primarily downtempo productions and the absence of its title track, which featured as a separate release on the label.

 Sand Promise	
 Groove Seeker	
 Softly Softly	
 Thunder Fog	
 Over The Top	
 Limbo	
 Mention
 Without You	
 Your Endless Sea	
 Rust	
 A River Alone	
 Stars We Can See

2017: The Deep
Composed entirely of his own productions, 'The Deep' is a mixture of downtempo and Drum and Bass featuring Calibre's own lyrics and vocal textures.

 No One Gets You	
 Up In Smoke	
 Mr Natural	
 Footloose	
 Lit	
 Give It Up	
 Complain	
 Enter
 Blind For Bang	
 Echoes	
 Better Than Me	
 Gentle Push	
 Round Box

2018: Shelflife 5
Released in June 2018, Shelflife 5 is the fifth in the 'Shelflife' series of previously-unreleased productions and includes collaborations with long-time artistic partner MC D.R.S. and producer Marcus Intalex.

 Makes Me 	
 Leave 
 The Dep 
 Addict 
 City Life (Featuring - DRS) 	
 Jaboc 
 Two Ones 	
 Self 	
 Deep Down 	
 Bluesday (Featuring - Marcus Intalex)	
 Funny Games 	
 Jass

2018: 4AM
Announced exclusively via Calibre's unofficial Facebook group, 4AM was released in 2018 and showcased the darker side of Calibre's Drum and Bass sound. Departing once again from his own label, the album was released on Doc Scott's label '31 Records'. Scott said of the surprise release "We wanted this to be a surprise release and I think we pulled it off. Everyone seems to know everything nowadays and that sucks, sometimes secrets are fun."

 Zee Tone	
 Dark Paths	
 Grabber
 Existing	
 Under You And You	
 Rollover	
 Let It Rain	
 The Swell

2019: Planet Hearth
Calibre released Planet Hearth in 2019. First coined in 2015, the album took four years to complete and was in his own words ‘part of a slow metamorphosis that I have wanted to do for a long time’. Inspired again by the island of Valentia on the West Coast of Ireland, the album explores Calibre's ambient persona in a series of atmospheric, narrative-driven works. The album is dedicated to a close friend. 
	
 Hills 
 Colby Park 	
 Eratik 	
 Five Minute Flame	
 Planet Hearth 
 Walking In Circles 	
 Sheven 
 Thought Fields 	
 Error 	
 Waiting For Reasons 	
 Chasm 
 Pine 	
 Down That Road

2020: Shelflife 6
Released at the start of May 2020, Shelflife 6 is the 6th iteration in Calibre's successful series of compilations. The album features productions spanning several years previous to its release and includes many tracks played at Calibre's previous summer residency at XOYO club in London, England.

 Things Like This
 Years	
 Latin 2000
 Pillow Dub	
 Guide You Through
 Puppet	
 Trouble
 Crazy For You	
 The Goat	
 One Drop	
 Sense Soirèe
 Be Beautiful	
 When Sunday Goes

2021: Feeling Normal 
Released on 26 February 2021, Feeling Normal shipped on his Calibre's own Signature imprint, and features collaborations with DRS and Cimone, the 13 track album follows 2019's Planet Hearth LP as another fully non drum & bass body of work, this time centered around a 140bpm theme with a variety of break beat and half time rhythms while remaining rooted in the familiar and warm sonic range associated with his style of mastering.

 Barren
 Change With Me
 Time To Breathe (with Cimone)
 Has To Happen
 Feeling Normal
 Badman (with DRS)
 Good Times
 Say Enough (with DRS)
 Miami
 Predictable
 Man Got Sandwich
 Wrong
 Regular Bull

2021: Shelflife 7
Released on 24 November digitally, with a 4 x 12" Vinyl LP to follow in May 2022,  Shelflife 7 is the latest iteration in Calibre's successful series of compilations featuring many unreleased and sought-after tracks. This album is distinct as it features many songs as suggested in Calibre's unofficial Facebook fan page, the 'Calibre aka Dominick Martin Appreciation Society™'.

 Wetter
 Cure Amen
 Cross The Line 
 Dumplings & Stew 
 Ready Beek 
 Calibre & Jet Li - Black Mountain 
 Snoopy 
 We Call It Rising 
 Blimp Op
 Roga Funk 
 Nearly Nothing
 Moonlight 
 Stoffen

2022: Double Bend
Double Bend was released on 2nd April 2022, and features 9 tracks of primarily 140 BPM productions. The album is the second of Calibre's to be released on fellow DJ Craig Richards (DJ)'s label 'The Nothing Special', following the Grow LP released in 2016. 

 Double Bend
 Hostage
 Savoury Skank
 Grinch
 Turtle Duv 
 Going to Ground
 Frinzingly
 Rare Groove
 Im Ent

Discography

Albums

EPs

References

External links
 
 

British drum and bass musicians
Electronic musicians from Northern Ireland
Club DJs
DJs from Northern Ireland
Living people
Year of birth missing (living people)
Electronic dance music DJs